The Artawi oil field is an oil field located in Basra Governorate. It was discovered in 1950 and developed by Basrah Oil Company. It will begin production in 2018 and will produce oil.

References

Oil fields of Iraq